Pigeonwood is a common name for several trees and may refer to:

 Trema (plant), a genus of about 15 species of evergreen trees
 Hedycarya arborea, a tree endemic to New Zealand